The Public Sector Transparency Board was established by the Prime Minister of the United Kingdom, David Cameron, in June 2010 to drive forward the UK Government's transparency agenda. In November 2015, its functions were taken over by the Data Steering Group.

Membership
The members of the board were:
Francis Maude (chair), then Minister for the Cabinet Office
Professor Sir Tim Berners-Lee
Dr Rufus Pollock
Professor Nigel Shadbolt
Andrew Stott
Dame Fiona Caldicott
Professor Sir Mark Walport
Steve Thomas
Bill Roberts
Professor David Rhind
Stephan Shakespeare
Heather Savory

See also
Open Data Institute

References

External links
 
Transparency Board Progress Note
Improving the Transparency and Accountability of Government and its Services

Cabinet Office (United Kingdom)
Public bodies and task forces of the United Kingdom government